Lieutenant-General (Korpskommandant) Roland Nef (born 1 July 1959) was the Chief of the Armed Forces (Chef der Armee) of Switzerland in 2008.

Nef, a jurist by profession, succeeded Lt-Gen. Christophe Keckeis in the position of Chief of the Armed Forces in January 2008. In July 2008, Nef resigned his post following media reports that his former partner had accused him of sexual harassment in a criminal complaint. The Swiss Federal Council accepted Nef's resignation on August 20, 2008.

During his military career, Nef held the following ranks and appointments:
 1988: Lieutenant / Captain; commander of an armoured howitzer battery
 1992: Captain in the General Staff; Intelligence Chief, Field Division 7
 1995: Major in the General Staff; Commander, Armoured Howitzer Battalion 33
 1999: Lieutenant-Colonel in the General Staff; Deputy Chief of staff / Operations, Field Division 7
 2001: Colonel in the General Staff; Chief of Staff, Field Division 7
 2002: Brigadier; Commander, Armoured Brigade 4
 2004: Commander, Armoured Brigade 11
 2007: Commander, Armour/Artillery Training Unit
 2008: Lieutenant-General, Chief of the Armed Forces

References

1959 births
Living people
People from Frauenfeld
Swiss military officers